Whatever Comes First is the debut album of the American country music band Sons of the Desert. The album was released in 1997 (see 1997 in country music) on Epic Records. It produced three singles for them on the Billboard country singles charts: the Top Ten "Whatever Comes First", as well as "Leaving October" and "Hand of Fate".

Content
"Drive Away" was co-written by Phil Vassar, who would later record the song for his self-titled debut album. Additionally, lead singer Drew Womack later re-recorded "Leaving October" on his 2004 self-titled debut.

Track listing

Personnel

Sons of the Desert
Scott Saunders - keyboards
Doug Virden - bass guitar, background vocals
Brian Westrum - drums
Drew Womack - acoustic guitar, lead vocals
Tim Womack - electric guitar, background vocals

Additional musicians
Bob Mason - cello on "Colorado"
Brent Mason - electric guitar on "Hand of Fate"
Tom Roady - percussion on "Drive Away," "Hand of Fate," "Promises"
Matt Rollings - keyboard on "Leaving October"
Billy Joe Walker, Jr. - acoustic guitar on "Promises"
John Willis - "eclectic guru instruments"

Chart performance

References
Liner notes to Whatever Comes First. Epic Records, 1997.

1997 debut albums
Epic Records albums
Sons of the Desert (band) albums
Albums produced by Doug Johnson (record producer)